Hot was Freda Payne's ninth studio album and her third and final for Capitol Records. Although she did record a few singles during the 1980s (including three for Ian Levine's UK Motorcity label), it would be 16 years before Payne came out with another studio album.

Track listing

Personnel
"Red Hot," "Can't Wait," "Gotta Keep Dancin'," "Savin' It (Save and Spend)," "Something's Missing (In My Life)," "The Longest Night" produced by: John Florez & Dr. Cecil Hale
"Hungry" produced by: Dr. Cecil Hale
"Red Hot," "Can't Wait," "Something's Missing (In My Life)," "The Longest Night" arranged by: Pete Robinson
"Can't Wait" and "The Longest Night" arranged by: Bruce Miller and Pete Robinson
"Gotta Keep Dancin'" and "Savin' It (Save and Spend)" arranged by: Bruce Miller
Recorded at Sound Factory, Kendun Recorders, Hollywood Sound Recorders, Filmways/Heider Studios, KSR Studios and Capitol Recording Studios
Engineers: Serge Reyes, Jeff Sykes, Grover Helsley, Steve Williams, George Sloan, Charles Faris
Mixed by: Dr. Cecil Hale
Re-mix engineer: Charles Faris
Assistants: Butch Lynch, Randy Pipes, Billyann Swopes, Chris McNary and John Taylor
Production assistance: Pete Robinson
Musicians
Drums: James Gadson, Quentin Dennard
Keyboards: Pete Robinson, Ron Coleman
Guitars: Lee Ritenour, Ron Cook, Bob "Boogie" Bowles, Paul M. Jackson, Jr.
Percussion: Joe Clayton, Alan Estes, Paulinho da Costa, Bob Zimmitti
Bass: Abraham Laboriel, Kevin Brandon
Background vocals: Scherrie Payne, Joyce Wilson, Susan Sheridan, Laura Creamer, Andrea Robinson and Freda Payne
Personal management: Joe Scandore & Stan Handman
Art direction: Roy Kohara
Photography: Phil Fewsmith
Design: Phil Shima

1979 albums
Freda Payne albums